Nagatomi (written: 永冨) is a Japanese surname. Notable people with the surname include:

, Japanese volleyball player
Masatoshi Nagatomi (1926–2000), Japanese professor of Buddhist studies
Keiko Nagatomi (born 1974), Japanese tennis player
, Japanese footballer

See also

Japanese-language surnames